In solid mechanics, it is common to analyze the properties of beams with constant cross section. Saint-Venant's theorem  states that the simply connected cross section with maximal torsional rigidity is a circle. It is named after the French mathematician Adhémar Jean Claude Barré de Saint-Venant.

Given a simply connected  domain D in the plane with area A,  the radius and  the area of its greatest inscribed circle, the torsional rigidity P 
of D is defined by

Here the supremum is taken over all the continuously differentiable functions vanishing on the boundary of D. The existence of this supremum is a consequence of Poincaré inequality.

Saint-Venant conjectured in 1856 that
of all domains D of equal area A the circular one has the greatest torsional rigidity, that is

 

A rigorous proof of this inequality was not given until  1948 by Pólya. Another proof was given by Davenport and reported in.  A more general proof and an estimate 

is given by Makai.

Notes

Elasticity (physics)
Calculus of variations
Inequalities
Physics theorems